The Bountiful Utah Temple is the 47th operating temple of the Church of Jesus Christ of Latter-day Saints.

The Bountiful Temple is the eighth temple constructed in the state of Utah.

History
The history of the temple site began back in 1897, when John Haven Barlow Sr. purchased  of land from the United States government. Because of lack of water and the steep terrain, little could be done with the land. In 1947 some of the land was cleared and four hundred apricot trees were planted. In the spring of 1983, flash flooding caused a great deal of damage in Bountiful, resulting in the decision to build a dam across the canyon to limit the flow of water during heavy rainstorms. The city requested the use of the soil from the future temple site, so construction crews removed over two hundred thousand cubic yards of soil, leaving the area an ideal spot on which the Latter-day Saint temple would later be built.

After considering numerous sites for the temple, the final decision was made on April 3, 1988, by church's First Presidency. Four years later, on May 2, 1992, the groundbreaking took place and on January 8, 1995, church president Howard W. Hunter dedicated the Bountiful Utah Temple. Two hundred thousand Latter-day Saints attended the dedicatory sessions, more than had ever previously attended a temple dedication.

On May 22, 2016, lightning struck the top of the Bountiful Utah temple. The strike damaged the angel Moroni statue atop the temple, causing it to lose part of its head and back. The statue, made of fiberglass and covered in gold leaf, was replaced two weeks after it was hit.

In 2020, the Bountiful Utah Temple was closed in response to the coronavirus pandemic.

Presidents
Notable presidents of the Bountiful Utah Temple include James O. Mason (2000–03) and Robert H. Garff (2012–15). The current president is Melvyn K. Reeves (2021-)

See also

 The Church of Jesus Christ of Latter-day Saints in Utah
 James O. Mason, former temple president
 Comparison of temples of The Church of Jesus Christ of Latter-day Saints
 List of temples of The Church of Jesus Christ of Latter-day Saints
 List of temples of The Church of Jesus Christ of Latter-day Saints by geographic region
 Temple architecture (Latter-day Saints)

References

External links
 
Bountiful Utah Temple Official site
Bountiful Utah Temple at ChurchofJesusChristTemples.org

20th-century Latter Day Saint temples
Buildings and structures in Bountiful, Utah
Religious buildings and structures completed in 1994
Temples (LDS Church) in Utah
1995 establishments in Utah